"Whatever You Need" is a song by American rapper Meek Mill. It is the lead single from his third album Wins & Losses. The song features singers Chris Brown and Ty Dolla Sign. It is a hip hop and R&B song that contains a sample of Tony! Toni! Toné!'s 1990 song "Whatever You Want" and from 1983 song "A Dream" by DeBarge.

Track listing

Charts

Weekly charts

Year-end charts

Certifications

References

2017 singles
Meek Mill songs
Chris Brown songs
Ty Dolla Sign songs
Songs written by Chris Brown
Songs written by Ty Dolla Sign
2017 songs
Songs written by Meek Mill
Song recordings produced by Mustard (record producer)
Maybach Music Group singles
Songs written by Larrance Dopson